Francis Marion Campbell (May 25, 1929 – July 13, 2016) was an American football defensive lineman and coach. He played college football for the Georgia Bulldogs from 1949 until 1951, where he was appropriately nicknamed "Swamp Fox" because of his first and middle names.  During his National Football League (NFL) playing career, he played for the San Francisco 49ers (1954–1955) and the Philadelphia Eagles (1956–1961), winning Pro Bowl honors in 1959 and 1960 and also being named 1st team All-Pro in 1960 as part of the Eagles' championship team that year. He was one of the last of the NFL's "two-way" players who played all offensive and defensive snaps in a game.

Coaching career

NFL
Campbell was head coach of the Atlanta Falcons (twice) and Philadelphia Eagles as well as the defensive coordinator for each team separate from his times as head coach. He also served as defensive line coach for the Boston Patriots (1962–1963), Minnesota Vikings (1964–1966), and the Los Angeles Rams (1967–1968). He was an expert in the 3–4 defense; his Eagles defenses ranked first in the league in points allowed in 1980 and 1981, and second and first in yards allowed. At 46 games under .500, Campbell's 34–80–1 head coaching record is the worst among all NFL head coaches to coach over 100 games and is the fifth lowest winning percentage among head coaches who have coached at least five seasons in the NFL. The only coaches with worse winning percentages are Phil Handler, Bert Bell, Carl Storck, and David Shula.

Georgia
Campbell spent the 1994 season as the defensive coordinator for his alma mater Georgia Bulldogs.

Head coaching record

Personal life
Campbell spent two years in the United States Army between college and the NFL. He lived in St. Augustine, Florida with his wife, the former June Roberts. The Campbells have two children: a daughter, Alicia Johnson, and a son, Scott.
In 2013, Campbell fell and broke multiple vertebrae in his neck. He died on July 13, 2016.

References

External links
 

1929 births
2016 deaths
American football defensive linemen
Atlanta Falcons coaches
Atlanta Falcons head coaches
Boston Patriots (AFL) coaches
Eastern Conference Pro Bowl players
Georgia Bulldogs football coaches
Georgia Bulldogs football players
Los Angeles Rams coaches
Minnesota Vikings coaches
National Football League defensive coordinators
People from Chester, South Carolina
Philadelphia Eagles coaches
Philadelphia Eagles head coaches
Philadelphia Eagles players
Players of American football from South Carolina
San Francisco 49ers players
United States Army soldiers